

Plants

Angiosperms

Arthropods

Arachnids

Insects

Molluscs

Bivalves

Fishes

Newly named placoderms

Newly named cartilaginous fish

Amphibians

Ichthyosaurs

Archosauromorphs

Newly named crurotarsans

Newly named dinosaurs
Data courtesy of George Olshevsky's dinosaur genera list.

Newly named birds

Newly named pterosaurs

Synapsids

Non-mammalian

See also

 2000 in science

Footnotes

Complete author list
As science becomes more collaborative, papers with large numbers of authors are becoming more common. To prevent the deformation of the tables, these footnotes list the contributors to papers that erect new genera and have many authors.

References

 
2000s in paleontology
Paleontology